Coptic (Bohairic Coptic:) is an Egyptian language family of closely related dialects, representing the most recent developments of the Egyptian language, and historically spoken by the Copts, starting from the third-century AD in Roman Egypt. Coptic was supplanted by Arabic as the primary spoken language of Egypt following the Muslim conquest of Egypt and was slowly replaced over the centuries. Coptic has no native speakers today, although it remains in daily use as the liturgical language of the Coptic Orthodox Church and of the Coptic Catholic Church. Innovations in grammar, phonology, and the influx of Greek loanwords distinguish Coptic from earlier periods of the Egyptian language. It is written with the Coptic alphabet, a modified form of the Greek alphabet with several additional letters borrowed from the Demotic Egyptian script.

The major Coptic dialects are Sahidic, Bohairic, Akhmimic, Fayyumic, Lycopolitan, and Oxyrhynchite. Sahidic Coptic was spoken between the cities of Asyut and Oxyrhynchus and flourished as a literary language across Egypt in the period  AD. Bohairic, the language of the Nile Delta, gained prominence in the 9th century and is the dialect used by the Coptic Church. Despite being closely related, Coptic dialects differ from one another in terms of their phonology, morphology, and vocabulary.

Name 
In Coptic the language is called  “Egyptian” or  “the Egyptian language”. Coptic also possessed the term  “Egyptian”, derived from Greek .

Geographic distribution 
Coptic is today spoken liturgically in the Coptic Orthodox and Coptic Catholic Church (along with Modern Standard Arabic). The language is spoken only in Egypt and historically has had little influence outside of the territory, except for monasteries located in Nubia. Coptic's most noticeable linguistic impact has been on the various dialects of Egyptian Arabic, which is characterised by a Coptic substratum in lexical, morphological, syntactical, and phonological features.

Influence on other languages 
In addition to influencing the grammar, vocabulary and syntax of Egyptian Arabic, Coptic has lent to both Arabic and Modern Hebrew such words as:

Coptic  is grammatically masculine and hence would have taken the form  with the definite articular prefix. Hence it is unclear why the word should have entered Arabic with an initial t, which would have required the word to be grammatically feminine.

A few words of Coptic origin are found in the Greek language; some of the words were later lent to various European languages — such as barge, from Coptic  ("small boat").

However, most words of Egyptian origin that entered into Greek and subsequently into other European languages came directly from Ancient Egyptian, often Demotic. An example is the Greek , which comes directly from Egyptian  or Demotic . However, Coptic reborrowed some words of Ancient Egyptian origin into its lexicon, via Greek. For example, both Sahidic and Bohairic use the word , which was taken directly from Greek  ("ebony"), originally from Egyptian .

Many place names in modern Egypt are Arabic adaptations of their former Coptic names:

The Coptic name ,  (from Egyptian ), means "belonging to God" or "he of God". It was also borrowed into Greek as the name . That, in turn, is the source of the Russian name , perhaps best known in the name of the mathematician Pafnuty Chebyshev.

History 

The Egyptian language may have the longest documented history of any language, from Old Egyptian that appeared just before 3200 BC to its final phases as Coptic in the Middle Ages. Coptic belongs to the Later Egyptian phase, which started to be written in the New Kingdom of Egypt. Later Egyptian represented colloquial speech of the later periods. It had analytic features like definite and indefinite articles and periphrastic verb conjugation. Coptic, therefore, is a reference to both the most recent stage of Egyptian after Demotic and the new writing system that was adapted from the Greek alphabet.

Pre-Islamic period 

The earliest attempts to write the Egyptian language using the Greek alphabet are Greek transcriptions of Egyptian proper names, most of which date to the Ptolemaic Kingdom. Scholars frequently refer to this phase as pre-Coptic. However, it is clear that by the Late Period of ancient Egypt, demotic scribes regularly employed a more phonetic orthography, a testament to the increasing cultural contact between Egyptians and Greeks even before Alexander the Great's conquest of Egypt. Coptic itself, or Old Coptic, takes root in the first century. The transition from the older Egyptian scripts to the newly adapted Coptic alphabet was in part due to the decline of the traditional role played by the priestly class of ancient Egyptian religion, who, unlike most ordinary Egyptians, were literate in the temple scriptoria. Old Coptic is represented mostly by non-Christian texts such as Egyptian pagan prayers and magical and astrological papyri. Many of them served as glosses to original hieratic and demotic equivalents. The glosses may have been aimed at non-Egyptian speakers.
Under late Roman rule, Diocletian persecuted many Egyptian converts to the new Christian faith, which forced new converts to flee to the Egyptian deserts. In time, the growth of these communities generated the need to write Christian Greek instructions in the Egyptian language. The early Fathers of the Coptic Church, such as Anthony the Great, Pachomius the Great, Macarius of Egypt and Athanasius of Alexandria, who otherwise usually wrote in Greek, addressed some of their works to the Egyptian monks in Egyptian. The Egyptian language, now written in the Coptic alphabet, flourished in the second and third centuries. However, it was not until Shenoute that Coptic became a fully standardised literary language based on the Sahidic dialect. Shenouda's native Egyptian tongue and knowledge of Greek and rhetoric gave him the necessary tools to elevate Coptic, in content and style, to a literary height nearly equal to the position of the Egyptian language in ancient Egypt.

Islamic period 

The Muslim conquest of Egypt by Arabs came with the spread of Islam in the seventh century. At the turn of the eighth century, Caliph Abd al-Malik ibn Marwan decreed that Arabic replace Koine Greek as the sole administrative language. Literary Coptic gradually declined, and within a few hundred years, Egyptian bishop Severus Ibn al-Muqaffaʿ found it necessary to write his History of the Patriarchs in Arabic. However, ecclesiastically the language retained an important position, and many hagiographic texts were also composed during this period. Until the 10th century, Coptic remained the spoken language of the native population outside the capital.

As a written language, Coptic is thought to have completely given way to Egyptian Arabic around the 13th century, though it seems to have survived as a spoken language until the 17th century and in some localities even longer.

The Coptic language massively declined under the hands of Fatimid Caliph Al-Hakim bi-Amr Allah, who issued strict orders completely prohibiting its use anywhere whether in homes, roadways, or schools. Those who didnt comply had their tongues cut off. He even ordered mothers that spoke to their children in Coptic to also have their tongue cut off. He personally walked the streets of Cairo and eavesdropped on Coptic-speaking homes to find out if any family was speaking Coptic.

From the medieval period there is one known example of tarsh-printed Coptic. The fragmentary amulet A.Ch. 12.145, now in the Austrian National Library, contains a frame of Coptic text around an Arabic main text.

In the early 20th century, some Copts tried to revive the Coptic language, but they were unsuccessful.

In the second half of the 20th century, Pope Cyril VI of Alexandria started a national Church-sponsored movement to revive Coptic. Several works of grammar were published, including a more comprehensive dictionary than had been formerly available. The scholarly findings of the field of Egyptology and the inauguration of the Institute of Coptic Studies further contributed to the renaissance. Efforts at language revitalisation continue to be undertaken, both inside and outside the Church, and have attracted the interest of Copts and linguists in and outside of Egypt.

In 2016, a new proposal to revive Coptic was forwarded.

Writing system 

Coptic uses a writing system almost wholly derived from the Greek alphabet, with the addition of a number of letters that have their origins in Demotic Egyptian. This is comparable to the Latin-based Icelandic alphabet, which includes the runic letter thorn. There is some variation in the number and forms of these signs depending on the dialect. Some of the letters in the Coptic alphabet that are of Greek origin were normally reserved for Greek words. Old Coptic texts used several graphemes that were not retained in the literary Coptic orthography of later centuries.

In Sahidic, syllable boundary may have been marked by a supralinear stroke ⟨◌̄⟩, or the stroke may have tied letters together in one word, since Coptic texts did not otherwise indicate word divisions. When djinkim is placed over a vowel it is pronounced independently, and when it is placed over a consonant a short  precedes it.

Literature 

The oldest Coptic writings date to the pre-Christian era (Old Coptic), though Coptic literature consists mostly of texts written by prominent saints of the Coptic Church such as Anthony the Great, Pachomius the Great and Shenoute. Shenoute helped fully standardise the Coptic language through his many sermons, treatises and homilies, which formed the basis of early Coptic literature.

Vocabulary 
The core lexicon of Coptic is Egyptian, most closely related to the preceding Demotic phase of the language. Up to 40% of the vocabulary of literary Coptic is drawn from Greek, but borrowings are not always fully adapted to the Coptic phonological system and may have semantic differences as well. There are instances of Coptic texts having passages that are almost entirely composed from Greek lexical roots. However, that is likely because the majority of Coptic religious texts are direct translations of Greek works.

Words or concepts for which no adequate Egyptian translation existed were taken directly from Greek to avoid altering the meaning of the religious message. In addition, other Egyptian words that would have adequately translated the Greek equivalents were not used as they were perceived as having overt pagan associations. Old Coptic texts use many such words, phrases and epithets; for example, the word  '(Who is) in (His) Mountain', is an epithet of Anubis. There are also traces of some archaic grammatical features, such as residues of the Demotic relative clause, lack of an indefinite article and possessive use of suffixes.

Thus, the transition from the 'old' traditions to the new Christian religion also contributed to the adoption of Greek words into the Coptic religious lexicon. It is safe to assume that the everyday speech of the native population retained, to a greater extent, its indigenous Egyptian character, which is sometimes reflected in Coptic nonreligious documents such as letters and contracts.

Phonology 
Coptic provides the clearest indication of Later Egyptian phonology from its writing system, which fully indicates vowel sounds and occasionally stress pattern. The phonological system of Later Egyptian is also better known than that of the Classical phase of the language because of a greater number of sources indicating Egyptian sounds, including cuneiform letters containing transcriptions of Egyptian words and phrases, and Egyptian renderings of Northwest Semitic names. Coptic sounds, in addition, are known from a variety of Coptic-Arabic papyri in which Arabic letters were used to transcribe Coptic and vice versa. They date to the medieval Islamic period, when Coptic was still spoken.

Vowels 
There are some differences of opinion among Coptic-language scholars on the correct phonetic interpretation of the writing system of Coptic. Differences centre on how to interpret the pairs of letters ε/η and ο/ω. In the Attic dialect of Ancient Greek in the 5th century BC, the first member of each pair is a short closed vowel , and the second member is a long open vowel .

These two charts show the two theories of Coptic vowel phonology:

Dialects vary in their realisation. Evidence is not sufficient to demonstrate that these are distinct vowels, and if they are, the difference has a very low functional load. For dialects that use orthographic <ει> for a single vowel, there appears to be no phonetic difference from <ι>.

Double orthographic vowels are presumed here to be long, as that makes the morphology more straightforward. (Another common interpretation is that these represented glottal stop.)

There is no length distinction in final stressed position, but only those vowels that occur long appear there: <(ε)ι, ε, α, ο~ω, ου>.

In Sahidic, the letter ε was used for short  before back fricatives, and also for unstressed schwa .

Bohairic did not have long vowels.  was only written <ι>.

It is difficult to explain <η>.

There were no doubled orthographic vowels in Mesokemic. Some representative correspondences with Sahidic are:

It is not clear if these correspondences reflect distinct pronunciations in Mesokemic, or if they are an imitation of the long Greek vowels <η, ω>.

Consonants 

Beside being found in Greek loanwords, the letters  were used in native words for a sequence of  plus , as in  =  "the-way" (f.sg.) and  =  "the-snake" (m.sg). The letters did not have this use in Bohairic, which used them for single sounds.

It is possible that in addition there was a glottal stop, that was not consistently written. Coptic does not seem to have had a glottal stop at the beginning of orthographically vowel-initial words. It is possible that vowels written double were an attempt to indicate glottal stop, rather than a long vowel, in the middle of a word. However, there is little evidence for this (e.g., Arabic words with short vowels and glottal stop are not written with double vowels in Coptic, and Coptic words with double orthographic vowels are transcribed with long vowels rather than hamza in Arabic.)

In Late Coptic (ca. 14th century), Bohairic sounds that did not occur in Egyptian Arabic were lost. A possible shift from a tenuis-aspirate distinction to voiced-tenuis is only attested from the alveolars, the only place that Arabic has such a contrast.

Earlier phases of Egyptian may have contrasted voiceless and voiced bilabial plosives, but the distinction seems to have been lost. That probably reflects dialect variation. Coptologists believe that Coptic  was articulated as a voiced bilabial fricative .

Apart from the liquid consonants, this pattern may indicate a sound change in Later Egyptian, leading to a neutralisation of voiced alveolar and velar plosives.

A few early manuscripts have a letter  or  ç where Sahidic and Bohairic have  š. and Akhmimic has  x. This sound seems to have been lost early on.

Grammar 
Coptic is agglutinative with subject–verb–object word order but can be verb–subject–object with the correct preposition in front of the subject. Number, gender, tense, and mood are indicated by prefixes that come from Late Egyptian. The earlier phases of Egyptian did this through suffixation. Some vestiges of the suffix inflection survive in Coptic, mainly to indicate inalienable possession and in some verbs. Compare the Middle Egyptian form *satāpafa 'he chooses' (written stp.f in hieroglyphs) to Coptic (Sahidic) f.sotp  'he chooses'.

Nouns 
All Coptic nouns carry grammatical gender, either masculine or feminine, usually marked through a prefixed definite article as in the Romance languages.

Bohairic:   – 'the man' /   – 'the hand'

Sahidic:   – 'the man' /   – 'the hand'

The definite and indefinite articles also indicate number; however, only definite articles mark gender. Coptic has a number of broken plurals, a vestige of Older Egyptian, but in the majority of cases, the article marks number.

Words of Greek origin keep their original grammatical gender, except for neuter nouns, which become masculine in Coptic.

Possession of definite nouns is expressed with a series of possessive articles which are prefixed to the noun. These articles agree with the person, number, and gender of the possessor and the number and gender of the possessed noun. The forms of the possessive article vary according to dialect.

Pronouns
Coptic pronouns are of two kinds, dependent and independent. Independent pronouns are used when the pronoun is acting as the subject of a sentence, as the object of a verb, or with a preposition. Dependent pronouns are a series of prefixes and suffixes that can attach to verbs and other nouns. Coptic verbs can therefore be said to inflect for the person, number and gender of the subject and the object: a pronominal prefix marks the subject, and a pronominal suffix marks the object, e.g. "I I'have'it the ball." When (as in this case) the subject is a pronoun, it normally is not also expressed independently, unless for emphasis.

As in other Afroasiatic languages, gender of pronouns differ only in the second and third person singular. The following table shows the pronouns of the Bohairic dialect:

Adjectives 
Most Coptic adjectives are actually nouns that have the attributive particle n to make them adjectival. In all stages of Egyptian, this morpheme is also used to express the genitive; for example, the Bohairic word for 'Egyptian', is a combination of the nominal prefix  rem- (the reduced form of  rōmi 'man'), followed by the genitive morpheme  ən ('of') and finally the word for Egypt,  kʰēmi.

Verbs 
Verbs within the Coptic language tend to be restricted to Durative sentences, Imperative Forms, Subordinate Clauses, Accusative & Dative Qualifiers, and many other unrecognized forms of structure.

There are four forms of a verb within the Coptic language, including: 
Absolute, Construct/Nominal, Pronominal & Qualitative/Stative.

The 'absolute' form is the default form of Bohairic verbs, it's used with prefixes:

Example: ⲥϧⲁⲓ ̀ⲙⲡⲓϫⲱⲙ - write the book

The 'Construct/Nominal' form is an unstressed form used when a noun object follows immediately with no prefix. Thus, the stress is moved from the verb to the noun. Only transitive verbs have a 'construct' form.

Example: ⲥϧⲁⲓ -> ⲥϧⲉ ⲡⲓϫⲱⲙ - write the book

The 'Pronominal' form is only taken when a suffix is attached. Only transitive verbs are considered to have a 'Pronominal' form.

Example: ⲥϧⲁⲓ -> ⲥϧⲉ -> ⲥϧⲏⲧϥ - write it

'Qualitative/Stative' is a form which expresses a state serving the function of a past participle.

Example: ⲥϧⲁⲓ -> ⲥϧⲉ -> ⲥϧⲏⲧ -> ⲥϧⲏⲟⲩⲧ, ⲡⲓϫⲱⲙ ⲉⲧⲥϧⲏⲟⲩⲧ - the written book

Infinitive forms is the standard form for Coptic verbs. Each verb followed in Bohairic has an infinitive marked with "̀ⲉ", "to not". Every verb also has a negative infinitive such as "ⲉϣⲧⲉⲙ", "to not".

Infinitive:  ̀ⲉⲥⲱⲧⲉⲙ, "To hear".

Negative Infinitive: ⲉϣⲧⲉⲙⲥⲱⲧⲉⲙ, "To not hear".

Bohairic, as a dialect, has 8 recorded pronouns. These are limited to:

Ⲁⲛⲟⲕ(I), Ⲁⲛⲟⲛ(We)

Ⲛⲑⲟⲕ(You m.), Ⲛⲑⲟ(You f.), Ⲛⲑⲱⲧⲉⲛ(You pl.)

Ⲛⲑⲟϥ(He), Ⲛⲑⲟⲥ(She), Ⲛⲑⲱⲟⲩ(They)

Pronouns can and typically are omitted when constructing sentences. As an example, English could be "We read the books", or in Bohairic, "Ⲁⲛⲟⲛ ⲧⲉⲛⲱϣ ̀ⲛⲛⲓϫⲱⲙ". This phrase would be simplified and commonly written as "Ⲧⲉⲛⲱϣ ̀ⲛⲓⲛⲓϫⲱⲙ".

Bohairic has a tendency to do 'Consonant Changes' in such letters as  ⲃ, ⲕ, ⲗ, ⲓ, ⲙ, ⲛ, ⲟⲩ & ⲣ.

For example:
Ⲕ turns into Ⲭ e.g. Ⲕⲥⲁϫⲓ, Ⲭⲟⲩⲱⲙ You speak, You eat

Ⲡ turns into Ⲫ e.g. Ⲡⲓϫⲱⲙ, Ⲫⲛⲟⲩϯ The book, (The) God

Ⲧ,Ϯ turns into Ⲑ e.g. Ϯⲓϣⲉⲣⲓ, Ⲑⲙⲁⲩ The girl, The mother

References
https://en.wiktionary.org/wiki/Appendix:Coptic_verbs

Verbal grade system 
Coptic, like Ancient Egyptian and Semitic languages, has root-and-pattern or templatic morphology, and the basic meaning of a verb is contained in a root and various derived forms of root are obtained by varying the vowel pattern. For example, the root for 'build' is kt.
(The nominal state grade is also called the construct state in some grammars of Coptic.)

The absolute, nominal, and pronominal state grades are used in different syntactic contexts. The absolute state grade of a transitive verb is used before a direct object with the accusative preposition , and the nominal state grade is used before a direct object with no case-marking.  The pronominal state grade is used before a pronominal direct object enclitic. In addition, many verbs also have a neutral state grade, used to express a state resulting from the action of the verb. Compare the following forms:

Absolute state grade

 – Aijimi əmpaiōt

Nominal state grade

 – Aijem paiōt

Pronominal state grade

 – Aijəntf

For most transitive verbs, both absolute and nominal state grade verbs are available for non-pronominal objects. However, there is one important restriction, known as Jernstedt's rule (or the Stern-Jernstedt rule) (Jernstedt 1927): present-tense sentences cannot be used in the nominal state grade. Thus sentences in the present tense always show a pattern like the first example above (absolute state), never the second pattern (nominal state).

In general, the four grades of Coptic verb are not predictable from the root, and are listed in the lexicon for each verb. The following chart shows some typical patterns of correspondence:

It is hazardous to make firm generalisations about the relationships between these grade forms, but the nominal state is usually shorter than the corresponding absolute and neutral forms. Absolute and neutral state forms are usually bisyllabic or contain a long vowel; the corresponding nominal state forms are monosyllabic or have short vowels.

Tense/aspect/mood inflection 
Coptic has a very large number of distinct tense-aspect-mood categories, expressed by particles which are either before the verb or before the subject. The future  is a preverbal particle and follows the subject:

 - Pecoeis nakrine ənnelaos

In contrast, the perfective  is a pre-subject particle:

 - A tefsōne de ol ənnefkēs

There is some variation in the labels for the tense/aspect/mood categories. (Where they agree, only one label is shown.) Each form lists the morphology found with a nonpronominal subject (Marked with an underscore in Coptic) and a third person singular masculine pronominal subject ('he'):

An approximate range of use for most of the tense/aspect/mood categories is shown in the following table:

Second tenses 
An unusual feature of Coptic is the extensive use of a set of "second tenses", which are required in certain syntactic contexts.  "Second tenses" are also called "relative tenses" in some work.

Prepositions 
Coptic has prepositions, rather than postpositions:

 – 

Pronominal objects of prepositions are indicated with enclitic pronouns:

 – 

 – 

Many prepositions have different forms before the enclitic pronouns.  Compare

 – 

 –

Syntax

Sentential syntax 
Coptic typically shows subject–verb–object (SVO) word order, as in the following examples:

 – 

 – 

 – 

This preposition functions like accusative case.

There is also an alternative  of the verb in which the direct object of the verb follows with no preposition:

 –

Dialects 

There is little written evidence of dialectal differences in the pre-Coptic phases of the Egyptian language due to the centralised nature of the political and cultural institutions of ancient Egyptian society. However, literary Old and Middle (Classical) Egyptian represent the spoken dialect of Lower Egypt around the city of Memphis, the capital of Egypt in the Old Kingdom. Later Egyptian is more representative of the dialects spoken in Upper Egypt, especially around the area of Thebes as it became the cultural and religious center of the New Kingdom.

Coptic more obviously displays a number of regional dialects that were in use from the coast of the Mediterranean Sea in northern Egypt, south into Nubia, and in the western oases. However, while many of these dialects reflect actual regional linguistic (namely phonological and some lexical) variation, they mostly reflect localised orthographic traditions with very little grammatical differences.

Upper Egypt

Sahidic 

Sahidic (also known as Thebaic) is the dialect in which most known Coptic texts are written, and was the leading dialect in the pre-Islamic period. It is thought to have originally been a regional dialect from the area around Hermopolis. Around 300 it began to be written in literary form, including translations of major portions of the Bible (see Coptic versions of the Bible). By the 6th century, a standardised spelling had been attained throughout Egypt. Almost all native authors wrote in this dialect of Coptic. Sahidic was, beginning in the 9th century, challenged by Bohairic, but is attested as late as the 14th.

While texts in other Coptic dialects are primarily translations of Greek literary and religious texts, Sahidic is the only dialect with a considerable body of original literature and non-literary texts. Because Sahidic shares most of its features with other dialects of Coptic with few peculiarities specific to itself, and has an extensive corpus of known texts, it is generally the dialect studied by learners of Coptic, particularly by scholars outside of the Coptic Church.

Akhmimic 
Akhmimic was the dialect of the area around the town of Akhmim. It flourished during the fourth and fifth centuries, after which no writings are attested. Akhmimic is phonologically the most archaic of the Coptic dialects.

Lycopolitan 
Lycopolitan (also known as Subakhmimic and Assiutic) is a dialect closely related to Akhmimic in terms of when and where it was attested, but manuscripts written in Lycopolitan tend to be from the area of Asyut. The main differences between the two dialects seem to be graphic in nature. The Lycopolitan variety was used extensively for translations of Gnostic and Manichaean works, including the texts of the Nag Hammadi library.

Lower Egypt

Bohairic 
 The Bohairic (also known as Memphitic) dialect originated in the western Nile Delta. The earliest Bohairic manuscripts date to the 4th century, but most texts come from the 9th century and later; this may be due to poor preservation conditions for texts in the humid regions of northern Egypt. It shows several conservative features in lexicon and phonology not found in other dialects. Bohairic is the dialect used today as the liturgical language of the Coptic Orthodox Church, replacing Sahidic some time in the eleventh century. In contemporary liturgical use, there are two traditions of pronunciation, arising from successive reforms in the 19th and 20th centuries (see Coptic pronunciation reform). Modern revitalisation efforts are based on this dialect.
 Bashmuric (also known as Mansurian and Dialect G) was a sub dialect of Bohairic most likely spoken in Eastern Delta. Its main characteristic is using solely Greek letters to represent Coptic phonemes.

Fayyumic 
 Fayyumic (also written as Faiyumic; in older works it is often called Bashmuric) was spoken primarily in the Faiyum west of the Nile Valley. It is attested from the 3rd to the 10th centuries. It is most notable for writing  (which corresponds to ), where other dialects generally use   (probably corresponding to a flap ). In earlier stages of Egyptian, the liquids were not distinguished in writing until the New Kingdom, when Late Egyptian became the administrative language.
 South Fayyumic (also called Dialect V) was spoken around modern towns of Beni Suef and Bush and is distinguished from central Fayyumic by not having lambdacism. 
 Ashmuninic (also known as Hermopolitan or Dialect H) was spoken around the city of Shmun and shares South Fayyumic features like vowel gemination and absence of lamdbacism.

Oxyrhynchite 
Oxyrhynchite (also known as Mesokemic or [confusingly] Middle Egyptian) is the dialect of Oxyrhynchus and surrounding areas. It shows similarities with Fayyumic and is attested in manuscripts from the fourth and fifth centuries.

See also 

 British Library Coptic Language Collection
 Coptic alphabet
 Coptic Orthodox Church
 Egyptian language
 Egyptian Arabic
 Nag Hammadi library
 List of Coptic place names
 Rosetta Stone

References

Further reading

General studies 
 
 Emmel, Stephen. 1992. "Languages (Coptic)". In The Anchor Bible Dictionary, edited by David Noel Freedman. Vol. 4 of 6 vols. New York: Doubleday. 180–188.
 
 Gignac, Francis Thomas. 1991. "Old Coptic". In The Coptic Encyclopedia, edited by Aziz Suryal Atiya. Vol. 8 of 8 vols. New York and Toronto: Macmillan Publishing Company and Collier Macmillan Canada. 169–188.
 Kasser, Radolphe. 1991. "Dialects". In The Coptic Encyclopedia, edited by Aziz Suryal Atiya. Vol. 8 of 8 vols. New York and Toronto: Macmillan Publishing Company and Collier Macmillan Canada. 87–96.
 Wolfgang Kosack. Lehrbuch des Koptischen.Teil I:Koptische Grammatik.Teil II:Koptische Lesestücke, Graz 1974.
 Loprieno, Antonio. 1995. Ancient Egyptian: A Linguistic Introduction. Cambridge: Cambridge University Press.
 Polotsky, Hans Jakob. 1971. "Coptic". In Afroasiatic: A Survey, edited by Carleton Taylor Hodge. (Jana Linguarum: Series Practica; 163). 's Gravenhage and Paris: Mouton. 67–79.

Grammars and grammatical studies 
 Chaîne, Marius. 1933. Éléments de grammaire dialectale copte: bohairique, sahidique, achmimique, fayoumique. Paris: Paul Geuthner.
 Eberle, Andrea, & Regine Schulz. 2004. Koptisch – Ein Leitfaden durch das Saïdische. LINCOM Languages of the World/Materials 07. Munich: LINCOM Europa.
 Jernstedt, Peter V. 1927. Das koptische Präsens und die Anknüpfungsarten des näheren Objekts. 'Comptes rendus de l'Academice des Sciences de l'Union République Soviétique Socialistes. 2, 69–74.
 
 Layton, Bentley. 2000. A Coptic Grammar (Sahidic Dialect): With a Chrestomathy and Glossary. (Porta linguarum orientalium; N.S., 20). Wiesbaden: Harrassowitz.
 Layton, Bentley. 2007. Coptic in 20 Lessons: Introduction to Sahidic Coptic with Exercises and Vocabularies. Peeters Publishers, .
 Mallon, Alexis. 1956. Grammaire copte: bibliographie, chrestomathie et vocabulaire. 4th edition. Beyrouth.
 Mattar, Nabil. 1990. A Study in Bohairic Coptic. Pasadena: Hope Publishing House.
 
 Polotsky, Hans Jakob. 1987. Grundlagen des koptischen Satzbaus. American Studies in Papyrology 28. Decatur, Ga.: Scholars Press.
 
 
 Shisha-Halevy, Ariel. 1988. Coptic Grammatical Chrestomathy: a course for academic and private study. Orientalia lovaniensia analecta 30. Leuven: Peeters.
 Shisha-Halevy, Ariel. 1986. Coptic Grammatical Categories: Structural Studies in the Syntax of Shenoutean Sahidic. Analecta Orientalia 53. Roma: Pontificium Institutum Biblicum. .
 Shisha-Halevy, Ariel. 2007. Topics in Coptic Syntax: Structural Studies in the Bohairic Dialect. Orientalia Lovaniensia Analecta 160. Leuven – Paris – Dudley, MA: Peeters. .
 Tattam, Henry, A compendious grammar of the Egyptian language as contained in the Coptic, Sahidic, and Bashmuric Dialects (London 1863)
 Till, Walter C. 1994. Koptische Dialektgrammatik. Berlin: Walter De Gruyter.
 Vergote, Jozef. 1973–1983. Grammaire copte. Leuven: Peeters.
 Younan, Sameh. 2005. So, you want to learn Coptic? A guide to Bohairic Grammar. Sydney: St.Mary, St.Bakhomious and St.Shenouda Coptic Orthodox Church.

Dictionaries 
 Černý, Jaroslav. 1976. Coptic Etymological Dictionary. Cambridge and New York: Cambridge University Press.
 Crum, Walter Ewing. 1939. A Coptic Dictionary. Oxford: Clarendon Press. Reprinted by Sandpiper Books Ltd, London & Powells Books, Chicago, 2000.
 Wolfgang Kosack: Koptisches Handlexikon des Bohairischen. Koptisch – Deutsch – Arabisch. Verlag Christoph Brunner, Basel 2013, .
 Vycichl, Werner. 1983. Dictionnaire étymologique de la langue copte. Leuven: Éditions Peeters.
 Westendorf, Wolfhart. 1965/1977. Koptisches Handwörterbuch. Heidelberg: Carl Winter.

Phonology 
 
 Depuydt, Leo. 1993. "On Coptic Sounds," Orientalia 62 (new series): 338–75.
 Greenberg, Joseph H (originally published 1962). "The interpretation of the Coptic vowel system," On Language: Selected Writings of Joseph H. Greenberg, eds., K Denning & S Kemmer. Stanford: Stanford University Press, 1990: 428–38.
 Grossman, Eitan and Martin Haspelmath. 2015. "The Leipzig-Jerusalem Transliteration of Coptic," Egyptian-Coptic Linguistics in Typological Perspective, eds., Eitan Grossman, Martin Haspelmath & Tonio Sebastian Richter. Berlin/Munich/Boston: Walter de Gruyter. 145–56.
Isḥāḳ, Emile Māher. 1975. "The phonetics and phonology of the Boḥairic dialect of Coptic and the Survival of Coptic Word in the Colloquial and Classical Arabic of Egypt and of Coptic Grammatical Constructions in Colloquial Egyptian Arabic". University of Oxford. 32-671.
 Loprieno, Antonio. 1997. "Egyptian and Coptic Phonology," Phonologies of Asia and Africa (Including the Caucasus), vol. 1, ed., Alan S. Kaye. Winona Lake: Eisenbrauns. 431–60.

Bibliographies 
 Kammerer, Winifred (compiler), A Coptic Bibliography, Ann Arbor: University of Michigan Press, 1950. (Reprint New York: Kraus Reprint Co., 1969)
 Wolfgang Kosack: Der koptische Heiligenkalender. Deutsch – Koptisch – Arabisch nach den besten Quellen neu bearbeitet und vollständig herausgegeben mit Index Sanctorum koptischer Heiliger, Index der Namen auf Koptisch, Koptische Patriarchenliste, Geografische Liste. Christoph Brunner, Berlin 2012, .
 Wolfgang Kosack: Schenute von Atripe De judicio finale. Papyruskodex 63000.IV im Museo Egizio di Torino. Einleitung, Textbearbeitung und Übersetzung herausgegeben von Wolfgang Kosack. Christoph Brunner, Berlin 2013, .
 Wolfgang Kosack: Basilios "De archangelo Michael": sahidice Pseudo – Euhodios "De resurrectione": sahidice Pseudo – Euhodios "De dormitione Mariae virginis": sahidice & bohairice : < Papyruskodex Turin, Mus. Egizio Cat. 63000 XI. > nebst Varianten und Fragmente. In Parallelzeilen ediert, kommentiert und übersetzt von Wolfgang Kosack. Christoph Brunner, Berlin 2014. .
 Wolfgang Kosack: Novum Testamentum Coptice. Neues Testament, Bohairisch, ediert von Wolfgang Kosack. Novum Testamentum, Bohairice, curavit Wolfgang Kosack. / Wolfgang Kosack. neue Ausgabe, Christoph Brunner, Basel 2014. .

External links 

 By Alin Suciu, a blog on Coptic literature and manuscripts
 France-copte.net By Mikhail David, French coptic site.
 Copticsounds – a resource for the study of Coptic phonology
 : Coptic language internet links and bibliography
 Coptica.ch Online library of Coptic texts at University of Geneva (site text in French)
 New Athena Unicode font; includes the new Coptic range
 Online Coptic tutorial
 A comprehensive Coptic language resource (Remenkimi) (Internet Archive)
 Coptic block in the Unicode 4.1 standard
 Heike Behlmer, Selected Bibliography on the Coptic Language
 Coptic texts and manuscripts at Leiden University Library
 Ifao N Copte – A professional Coptic font for researchers.
 a set of Coptic fonts
 GNU FreeFont—FreeSerif face includes a Coptic range.

 
Roman Egypt
Byzantine Egypt
Coptic Orthodox Church
Medieval languages
Languages of Egypt
Christian liturgical languages
Greek alphabet
Languages of Africa
Egyptian languages
Afro-Asiatic Languages
Languages attested from the 2nd century
Languages extinct in the 17th century